Hans Christian von Baeyer (born 1938) is a Chancellor Professor of Physics at the College of William and Mary. His books include Information: The New Language of Science, Warmth Disperses and Time Passes: The History of Heat and QBism: The Future of Quantum Physics.

He received the Science Journalism Award of the American Association for the Advancement of Science and the National Magazine Award in the category "Essays and Criticism," which cites his "uncommon literary grace". In addition, he also won the 2005 Andrew Gemant Award for science writing, for prose "crisp, captivating and illuminating" with "depth, passion and clarity" in the ideas conveyed.

von Baeyer was born in Germany and left the country during World War II. He graduated from Columbia College in 1958 and received his M.S. from the University of Miami and Ph.D. from Vanderbilt University. He is a descendant of German geologist and military officer Johann Jacob Baeyer, whose son, Adolf von Baeyer, won the 1905 Nobel Prize in Chemistry.

In 1976, von Baeyer was selected as a Fellow of the American Physical Society.

Bibliography 

 

 
 
 First published as:

References

External links

 

1938 births
Living people
21st-century American physicists
American non-fiction writers
College of William & Mary faculty
Discover (magazine) people
Fellows of the American Physical Society
Probability theorists

Columbia College (New York) alumni
Vanderbilt University alumni
University of Miami alumni